Elymoclavine is an ergot alkaloid (ergoline alkaloid). It can be produced from C. fusiformis from Pennisetum typhoideum. It is a precursor in the biosynthesis of D-(+)-lysergic acid. Ergot alkaloids are natural products derived from L-tryptophan. They are often toxic for humans and animals. Despite that they are also well known for their pharmacological activities.

Biosynthesis

The main building blocks for biosynthesis of elymoclavine are tryptophan (Trp) and DMAPP. DMATrp is obtained after electrophilic substitution followed by addition (Step A below). Then an amine is methylated by an N-methyltransfersase (Step B). Next, the allyl alcohol is oxidized to the diene (Step C).  After 1,4-elimination, the diene undergoes an epoxidation (Step D). Then decarboxylation is followed by the 6-member ring formation and epoxide opened to form terminal alcohol (Step E). Obtained chanoclavine gets oxidized to chanoclavine aldehyde (Step F). Then the second 6-member ring forms and agroclavine is obtained after additional reductase (Steps G and H). Finally elymoclavine is generated after an oxidation (Step I). The last step is NADPH-dependent, and it is suggested that cytochrome P450 is the catalyst.

References 

Ergot alkaloids